Scamander (also Skamandros or Xanthos was a river god in Greek mythology.

Etymology 
The meaning of this name is uncertain. The second element looks like it is derived from Greek  meaning 'of a man', but there are sources who doubt this. The first element is more difficult to pinpoint; it could be derived from  'to limp, to stumble (over an obstacle)' or from  meaning 'left(-handed), awkward'. The meaning of the name might then perhaps be 'limping man' or 'awkward man'. This would refer to the many bends and winds (meanders) of the river, which does not run straight, but "limps" its way along.

Geography
The Scamander River was named after the river god Scamander. The Scamander River was the river that surrounded Troy. The god Scamander took the side of the Trojans in the Trojan War.

Family 
According to Hesiod, Scamander is the son of Oceanus and Tethys. He is alternately described as a son of Zeus. He was the father of King Teucer, whose mother was the water nymph Idaea. He was also mentioned as the father of Glaucia, lover of Deimachus. Xanthus was credited to be the father of Eurythemista who bore Pelops and Niobe to Tantalus. Strymo or Rhoeo, wife of Laomedon, king of Troy was also called his daughter.

Mythology 

Scamander fought on the side of the Trojans during the Trojan War (Iliad XX, 73/74; XXI), after the Greek hero Achilles insulted him. Scamander was also said to have attempted to kill Achilles three times, and the hero was only saved due to the intervention of Hera, Athena and Hephaestus. In this context, he is the personification of the Scamander River that flowed from Mount Ida across the plain beneath the city of Troy, joining the Hellespont north of the city. The Achaeans, according to Homer, had set up their camp near its mouth, and their battles with the Trojans were fought on the plain of Scamander. In Iliad XXII (149ff), Homer states that the river had two springs: one produced warm water; the other yielded cold water, regardless of the season.

According to Homer, he was called Xanthos by gods and Scamander by men, which might indicate that the former name refers to the god and the latter one to the river itself.

Trojan descendants

See also

 Karamenderes River

Notes

References 
 Hesiod, Theogony, in The Homeric Hymns and Homerica with an English Translation by Hugh G. Evelyn-White, Cambridge, Massachusetts., Harvard University Press; London, William Heinemann Ltd. 1914. Online version at the Perseus Digital Library.
 Homer, The Iliad with an English Translation by A.T. Murray, Ph.D. in two volumes. Cambridge, Massachusetts., Harvard University Press; London, William Heinemann, Ltd. 1924. Online version at the Perseus Digital Library.
 Tsotakou-Karveli. Lexicon of Greek Mythology. Athens: Sokoli, 1990.

Potamoi
Deities in the Iliad
Anatolia
Children of Zeus